Reece Gaskell is an English professional footballer who plays as a midfielder for Oldham Athletic.

Career
On 22 October 2019, Gaskell made his debut for Oldham Athletic as a substitute in a 2–0 win against Walsall. In November 2019, Gaskell signed for Runcorn Linnets on loan.

Career statistics

References

2000s births
Living people
Footballers from Warrington
Association football midfielders
English footballers
Oldham Athletic A.F.C. players
Runcorn Linnets F.C. players
English Football League players